Stuart Swales was an English footballer who played as an outside left.

Career
Swales signed for Bradford City as an amateur in 1937. He made 13 league and 1 FA Cup appearances for the club, before being released in 1938.

Sources

References

Date of birth missing
Date of death missing
English footballers
Bradford City A.F.C. players
English Football League players
Association football outside forwards